Gustavo Trelles  (born 15 November 1955 in Minas) is a Uruguayan former rally driver. He competed actively in the World Rally Championship from 1988 to 1993, mainly with a Lancia Delta Integrale, and from 1996 to 2002, mainly with a Mitsubishi Lancer Evolution. 

In the WRC, Trelles' best event result was third at the 1992 Rally Argentina with the Delta HF Integrale. His highest placing in the Drivers' World Championship was ninth, during the 1993 season, when he competed with a Delta Integrale for the Jolly Club team, finishing fourth at the Rally Argentina, fifth at the Acropolis Rally, sixth at the Rally Catalunya and seventh at the Rally New Zealand.

In the production car class, Trelles achieved much success with his Lancer Evolution. He won the FIA Group N Cup (now the World Rally Championship-3) title four years in a row from 1996 to 1999, and finished runner-up in 1990, 2000 and 2001.

WRC results

References

External links
Trelles at World Rally Archive
Trelles at RallyBase

1955 births
Living people
People from Lavalleja Department
Uruguayan rally drivers
World Rally Championship drivers